Al Dabbah Airport  is an airport serving the town of Al Dabbah in Sudan.

See also
 Transport in Sudan
 List of airports in Sudan

References

 OurAirports - Sudan
   Great Circle Mapper - El Debba
 El Debba
 Google Earth

External links
 

Al Dabbah